Cabinet National Forest was established in Idaho and Montana by the U.S. Forest Service on March 2, 1907 with , mostly in Montana.  On July 1, 1954 it was divided among Kaniksu, Kootenai and Lolo National Forests.

See also
 List of forests in Montana

References

External links
Forest History Society
Listing of the National Forests of the United States and Their Dates (from Forest History Society website) Text from Davis, Richard C., ed. Encyclopedia of American Forest and Conservation History. New York: Macmillan Publishing Company for the Forest History Society, 1983. Vol. II, pp. 743-788.

Former National Forests of Idaho
Former National Forests of Montana
1907 establishments in Montana
1907 establishments in Idaho
Protected areas established in 1907
Protected areas disestablished in 1954
1954 disestablishments in Idaho
1954 disestablishments in Montana